Wang Wenfeng (born June 20, 1993) is a Chinese Muay Thai kickboxer. He is the 2018 KLF 61.5 kg tournament winner.

He was ranked as a top ten bantamweight (-65 kg) kickboxer in the world by Combat Press between June 2018 and January 2021.

Kickboxing career

Kunlun Fight
Wenfeng faced the Enfusion -60 kg champion Ilias Ennahachi at Kunlun Fight 66 on November 5, 2017, in the quarterfinals of the -61.5 kg Tournament. He won the fight by decision and advanced to the semifinals, where he was able to overcome Lin Qiangbang by decision as well. He failed to capture the tournament title however, as he lost a majority decision to Saeksan Or. Kwanmuang in the tournament finals.

Wenfeng faced Giorgi Khupenia at Kunlun Fight 70 on March 11, 2018. He won the fight by unanimous decision.

Wenfeng faced Cristian Spetcu at Kunlun Fight 74 on May 13, 2018, in the quarterfinals of the Kunlun Fight -61.5 kg World Tournament. He won the fight by split decision and advanced to the semifinals of the one-day tournament, where he faced the two-weight ISKA World champion Daniel Puertas Gallardo. Wenfeng won the fight by unanimous decision. He faced beat Lin Qiangbang by unanimous decision in the finals.

Wenfeng faced the Wu Lin Feng lightweight (-63 kg) champion at David Zunwu World Fighting Championship on September 29, 2018. He lost the fight by unanimous decision.

Wenfeng faced Enzo Petricig at All Star Fight 8 on March 9, 2019. He won the fight by unanimous decision.

ONE Championship
Wengeng challenged the ONE Kickboxing Flyweight World champion Ilias Ennahachi at ONE Championship: Age Of Dragons on November 16, 2019. He lost the fight by split decision.

Wenfeng faced Azwan Che Will at ONE Championship: Reign of Dynasties 2 on October 17, 2020. He won the fight by unanimous decision.

Wanfeng was booked to face Taiki Naito at ONE: Full Blast 2 on June 11, 2021. Naito won the fight by unanimous decision.

Championships and awards 
Amateur
 2012 China Muay Thai 57 kg champion
 2015 China Muay Thai 60 kg champion
 2015 IFMA Royal World Cup -60 kg 
 2016 China Muay Thai 60 kg champion
 2016 Asian Beach Games -60 kg 
Professional
Kunlun Fight
 2017 Kunlun Fight 61.5 kg 8 Man Tournament Runner-up
 2018 Kunlun Fight 61.5 kg World Tournament Champion

Fight record

|-  style="text-align:center; background:#FFBBBB;"
| 2021-06-11|| Loss ||align=left| Taiki Naito ||  |ONE Championship: Full Blast 2 || Singapore || Decision (Unanimous) || 3 || 3:00
|-  style="text-align:center; background:#cfc;"
| 2020-10-17|| Win ||align=left| Azwan Che Will || ONE Championship: Reign of Dynasties 2|| Kallang, Singapore || Decision (Unanimous) || 3 || 3:00
|-  style="text-align:center; background:#FFBBBB;"
| 2019-11-16|| Loss ||align=left| Ilias Ennahachi || ONE Championship: Age Of Dragons || Beijing, China || Decision (Split) || 5 || 3:00
|-
! style=background:white colspan=9 |
|-  style="text-align:center; background:#c5d2ea;"
| 2019-05-28|| Draw||align=left| Johnny || MAS FIGHT|| China || MAS FIGHT rules (KO or Draw) || 3 || 3:00
|-  style="text-align:center; background:#cfc;"
| 2019-03-09|| Win ||align=left| Enzo Petricig || All Star Fight 8|| Thailand || Decision (Unanimous)|| 3 || 3:00
|-  style="text-align:center; background:#cfc;"
| 2018-12-15|| Win ||align=left| Feng Liang || Kunlun Fight 79 || China || Decision (Unanimous) || 3 || 3:00
|-  style="text-align:center; background:#FFBBBB;"
| 2018-09-29 || Loss ||align=left| Dennis Wosik || David Zunwu World Fighting Championship || Macau || Decision (Unanimous) || 3 || 3:00
|-  style="text-align:center; background:#cfc;"
| 2018-05-13|| Win ||align=left| Lin Qiangbang || Kunlun Fight 74 World -61.5 kg Tournament, Final || Jinan, China || Decision (Unanimous) || 3 || 3:00
|-
! style=background:white colspan=9 |
|-  style="text-align:center; background:#cfc;"
| 2018-05-13|| Win ||align=left| Daniel Puertas Gallardo || Kunlun Fight 74 World -61.5 kg Tournament, Semi Finals || Jinan, China || Decision (Unanimous) || 3 || 3:00
|-  style="text-align:center; background:#cfc;"
| 2018-05-13|| Win ||align=left| Cristian Spetcu || Kunlun Fight 74 World -61.5 kg Tournament, Quarter Finals || Jinan, China || Decision (Split)|| 3 || 3:00
|-  style="text-align:center; background:#cfc;"
| 2018-03-11|| Win ||align=left| Giorgi Khupenia || Kunlun Fight 70 || Sanya, China || Decision (Unanimous)|| 3 || 3:00
|-  style="text-align:center; background:#FFBBBB;"
| 2017-11-05 || Loss ||align=left| Saeksan Or. Kwanmuang ||Kunlun Fight 66 - 61.5 kg 8 Man Tournament, Final || Wuhan, China || Decision (Majority) || 3 || 3:00
|-  style="text-align:center; background:#cfc;"
| 2017-11-05 || Win ||align=left| Lin Qiangbang || Kunlun Fight 66 - 61.5 kg 8 Man Tournament, Semi Finals || Wuhan, China || Decision || 3 || 3:00
|-  style="text-align:center; background:#cfc;"
| 2017-11-05 || Win ||align=left| Ilias Ennahachi || Kunlun Fight 66 - 61.5 kg 8 Man Tournament, Quarter Finals || Wuhan, China || Decision || 3 || 3:00
|-  style="text-align:center; background:#cfc;"
| 2017-07-15|| Win ||align=left| Jano Partsvania || Kunlun Fight 64 || Chongqing, China || Decision (Unanimous) || 3 || 3:00
|-  style="text-align:center; background:#cfc;"
| 2017-05-14 || Win ||align=left| Vladimir Lytkin || Kunlun Fight 61 || Sanya, China || KO || 1 ||
|-  style="text-align:center; background:#FFBBBB;"
| 2017-03-11 || Loss ||align=left| Alex Dass || Kunlun Fight 58 61 kg Qualifier Tournament, Final || Roma, Italy || Decision (Unanimous) || 3 || 3:00
|-  style="text-align:center; background:#cfc;"
| 2017-03-11 || Win ||align=left| Andrea Serra || Kunlun Fight 58 61 kg Qualifier Tournament, Semi-Final || Roma, Italy || Decision (Split) || 4 || 3:00
|-  style="text-align:center; background:#cfc;"
| 2017-01-01 || Win ||align=left| Denis Puric || Kunlun Fight 56 || China || Decision (majority) || 3 || 3:00
|-  style="text-align:center; background:#cfc;"
| 2016-12-03 || Win ||align=left| Sergio Wielzen || Mix Fight Gala 20 || Germany || Decision || 3 || 3:00
|-  style="text-align:center; background:#cfc;"
| 2016-10-30 || Win ||align=left| Chan Hyung Lee || Kunlun Fight 54 || Hubei, China || Decision (Unanimous) || 3 || 3:00
|-  style="text-align:center; background:#cfc;"
| 2016-09-03 || Win ||align=left| Kana Hyatt || Red Idol I-1 World Muaythai Championships || China || Decision (Unanimous) ||  ||
|-  style="text-align:center; background:#cfc;"
| 2016-06-25 || Win ||align=left| Muhammad Haidari || World Fighting Champions League · Shenzhen  || China ||  ||  ||

|-  style="text-align:center; background:#cfc;"
| 2016-06-08 || Win ||align=left| Shin Sugita || FWH || China || KO ||  ||

|-  style="text-align:center; background:#cfc;"
| 2016-05-28 || Win ||align=left| Sikepet || Heroes of the Silk Road 14 || China || Decision (Unanimous) ||  ||

|-  style="text-align:center; background:#cfc;"
| 2015-10-24 || Win||align=left| Amundi || Royal Cup Charity Fight Night || Bangkok, Thailand || KO ||  ||

|-  style="text-align:center; background:#fbb;"
| 2015-10-10 || Loss||align=left| Rui Briceno || Wu Lin Feng x Dynamite Fight Night 29 || Portugal || Decision|| 3 ||3:00
|-  style="text-align:center; background:#cfc;"
| 2015-06-02 || Win ||align=left| Kong Long || Wu Lin Feng || China || ||  ||
|-  style="text-align:center; background:#cfc;"
| 2015-05-22 || Win ||align=left| Lukdod Sor.Manutchai || Onesongchai || Thailand || ||  ||

|-  style="text-align:center; background:#FFBBBB;"
| 2014-12-05 || Loss||align=left|  || Wu Lin Feng - Thailand|| Thailand|| Decision || 3 || 3:00

|-  style="text-align:center; background:#FFBBBB;"
| 2014-09-28 || Loss||align=left| Ilias Ennahachi || Wu Lin Feng - Mejiro Gym || Zaandam, Netherlands || Decision || 4 || 3:00
|-  style="text-align:center; background:#FFBBBB;"
| 2014-07-26 || Loss||align=left| Tremischov Genghis Khan || Wu Lin Feng - Kazakhstan|| Kazakhstan|| Decision || 3 || 3:00
|-
| colspan=9 | Legend:    

|-  style="background:#fbb;"
| 2016-09-|| Loss ||align=left| Nguyễn Trần Duy Nhất || 2016 Asian Beach Games, Final || Da Nang, Vietnam || Decision || 3 || 
|-
! style=background:white colspan=9 |
|-  style="background:#cfc;"
| 2016-09-|| Win||align=left|  || 2016 Asian Beach Games, Semi Final || Da Nang, Vietnam || Decision || 3 ||
|-  style="background:#cfc;"
| 2015-08-22|| Win||align=left| Guillaume Lorenzo || 2015 IFMA Royal World Cup, -60 kg Final || Bangkok, Thailand || Decision || 3 || 
|-
! style=background:white colspan=9 |
|-  style="background:#cfc;"
| 2015-08-|| Win||align=left| Oleksandr Kolontai || 2015 IFMA Royal World Cup, -60 kg Semi Final || Bangkok, Thailand ||Decision || 3 ||
|-  style="background:#cfc;"
| 2015-08-|| Win||align=left| Amonov || 2015 IFMA Royal World Cup, -60 kg Quarter Final || Bangkok, Thailand ||Decision || 3 ||
|-  style="background:#cfc;"
| 2015-08-|| Win||align=left| Travis Clay || 2015 IFMA Royal World Cup, -60 kg Second Round || Bangkok, Thailand || ||  ||
|-  style="background:#cfc;"
| 2015-08-|| Win||align=left| Yusuf Samil Ozkaya || 2015 IFMA Royal World Cup, -60 kg First Round || Bangkok, Thailand || Decision || 3 || 

|-  bgcolor="#fbb"
| 2012-09-09 || Loss ||align=left| Kirill Tuzovskiy Anatolievich|| 2012 IFMA World Championships|| Saint Petersburg, Russia ||  ||  || 
|-  bgcolor="#cfc"
| 2012-09-08 || Win ||align=left| Modh Ali Yaakub|| 2012 IFMA World Championships|| Saint Petersburg, Russia ||  ||  || 

|-
| colspan=9 | Legend:

See also
 List of male kickboxers

References 

Chinese male kickboxers
1993 births
Living people
People from Hefei
Kunlun Fight kickboxers
ONE Championship kickboxers
Sportspeople from Anhui
Chinese Muay Thai practitioners
Kunlun Fight kickboxing champions